A list of the published work of Adam Gopnik, American writer and editor.

Books

Essays, reporting and other contributions

Notes

Bibliographies by writer
Bibliographies of American writers